The Limbless Association is a charitable organization in the United Kingdom set up to help those with limb loss, and assist their families and carers. It is registered with the Charity Commission for England and Wales and its charity registration number is 803533. The association provides information, advice, and support for people of all ages who are without one or more limbs.

History 
During World War I there was a need for an association for ex-servicemen with lost limbs and the British Limbless Ex-Servicemans’ Association (BLESMA) was set up for them. It was not until many years later though that the Limbless Association, then called the National Association for Limbless Disabled, was formed for non-servicemen with congenital or later-onset limb loss, becoming a Registered Charity in 1983.

The first Chair of the Association was Sam Gallop CBE. The current Chair of Trustees is David Rose JP.

External links
Official website

Charities based in London